Vitaly Stepanovich Smirnov (16 February 1930 – 1 November 2007) was a Soviet diplomat. He served as the Soviet ambassador to Pakistan during the 1980s. His tenure was characterised by several notable events in Pakistan–USSR relations, including the Soviet–Afghan War and the Badaber Uprising in Peshawar in 1985. Earlier, he was the Permanent Representative of Belarus to the United Nations (1967–1974).

References

1930 births
2007 deaths
People from Liozna District
Ambassadors of the Soviet Union to Pakistan
Belarusian diplomats
Permanent Representatives of Belarus to the United Nations
Ambassadors of the Soviet Union to Bangladesh
Belarusian State University alumni